Brett Murphy is an American journalist, best known as a Pulitzer Prize finalist in 2018 for his investigative reporting series on the exploitation of truckers in California. He was also a child actor in the early 2000s, appearing in films including Fever Pitch.  

Murphy's article "Rigged", published by USA Today and detailing the financial exploitation of port truckers won plaudits including the Hillman Prize, the National Headliner Award for Investigative Reporting, the Gerald Loeb Award, the Sidney Award and the Al McDowell Award. He was a finalist for both the Pulitzer Prize in National Reporting and the ASNE Awards for Justice in Journalism. Murphy had previously been a  finalist for the IRE Awards in Investigation Innovation in 2016.

Before joining USA Today as an investigative reporter, Murphy worked for the Naples Daily News, CBS Interactive, and the magazine Pitt Med . He has also contributed to the Guardian, Univision, San Jose Mercury News, CNET, NPR, and PBS affiliate KQED.

Early life and acting career
Murphy was born October 4, 1991 in Worcester, Massachusetts. His early life included a child acting career spanning theater, commercials, films, and television shows. Murphy's acting career spanned 2003 until 2006. After performing in local youth theatre, Murphy appeared in commercials including for Disney World, Ocean Spray, General Mills, Campbell's, The New York Post, and Papa Gino's. From 2003 until 2005, Murphy had a recurring role as Edwin in five episodes of the ABC sitcom Hope and Faith. In 2005, Murphy had a role in the feature film Fever Pitch as Ryan.  In 2005, Murphy appeared in the feature film Fever Pitch and an episode of Saturday Night Live. Murphy's last professional acting credit was an appearance in the pilot Damages. Murphy attended St. John's High School in Shrewsbury, Massachusetts.

Education
Murphy studied non-fiction writing at the University of Pittsburgh and graduated with a Bachelor of Arts on Dec. 14, 2013, summa cum laude. He subsequently attended the University of California, Berkeley's Graduate School of Journalism, graduating with a Master of Journalism in May 2016.

Journalism career
Brett Murphy currently works for the USA Today network in Florida as an investigative reporter. His series “Rigged: Forced in Debt. Worked Past Exhaustion,” reporting on labor exploitation in the California trucking industry won him critical acclaim in 2018. California passed legislation Senate Bill No. 1402 to hold labor violations more accountable after its publication. Murphy co-founded the weekly newsletter Local Matters with fellow journalists Joseph Cranney and Alexandra Glorioso in 2016, curating local investigative news from over 100 different newspapers.

External links

1991 births
American male child actors
American male film actors
Living people
American male television actors
Male actors from Worcester, Massachusetts
21st-century American male actors

American investigative journalists